Yemmetovo (Yämmät) is a rural locality (a selo) in Nureyevsky Selsoviet, Sharansky District, Bashkortostan, Russia. The population was 397 as of 2010. There are 3 streets.

Geography 
Yemmetovo is located 31 km southeast of Sharan (the district's administrative centre) by road. Tugaryak is the nearest rural locality.

References 

Rural localities in Sharansky District